Roll Call is a 1965 Soviet drama film directed by Daniil Khrabrovitsky.

Plot 
The film tells about General Zhuravlev, who after the war is engaged in the creation of spaceships. He sets a rocket with astronaut Borodin into the sky and recalls his namesake, whom he met in the war.

Cast 
 Nikita Mikhalkov as Sergey Borodin
 Oleg Strizhenov as Aleksey Borodin kozmonavt
 Marianna Vertinskaya as Katya
 Tatyana Doronina as Nika
 Vasiliy Merkurev as Viktor Ilyich Zhuravlyov
 Yevgeny Steblov as Sasha Amelchenko
 Shavkat Gaziyev as Mekhanik-voditel tankovogo ekipazha
 Leonid Obolensky
 Vsevolod Sanaev as Varentsev
 Yevgeny Vesnik as Vasya

References

External links 
 

1965 films
1960s Russian-language films
Soviet drama films
1965 drama films